TANS may refer to:

 TANS Perú, a defunct Peruvian airline
 Territorial Army Nursing Service, a British military nursing organisation which amalgamated into Queen Alexandra's Royal Army Nursing Corps
 Tabled variant asymmetric numeral systems (tANS), in asymmetric numeral systems

See also
 Tan (disambiguation)